Leroy Hugh Logan  is a former police superintendent in the UK. He was both a founding member of the Black Police Association and its chairman for 30 years.

Logan left the Metropolitan Police at the rank of superintendent having been involved in the Stephen Lawrence Inquiry, the inquiry into the killing of Damilola Taylor and the organisation of the London 2012 Olympics.

In 2020, Logan published his first book Closing Ranks, My Life as a Cop which described his time as a senior police officer in London. Red, White and Blue, a dramatisation of Logan's decision to join and of his early time in the police service, was broadcast on BBC One in the United Kingdom and Amazon Prime in the United States in winter 2020. Logan was played by the actor John Boyega.

Early life and education
Born in 1957 in Islington, London, to Jamaican parents, Logan attended Highbury Grove School for secondary education and Hackney Community College where he studied biology, chemistry and physics for A-Level. After leaving school, he attended the University of East London from 1976 to 1980 where he earned a BSc degree in applied biology. In 2013, the University of East London awarded Logan an honorary PhD for his services to policing.

Career
Logan joined the police force in 1983, having previously worked as a research scientist. He was inspired to join the police after witnessing two officers assault his father.

Logan was described by The Voice newspaper as "one of the Black officers who helped change the Met". In 2000, he was awarded an MBE for his work in advancing policing.

As chair of the Black Police Association, he was involved in the Stephen Lawrence enquiry and the enquiry into the killing of Damilola Taylor. Logan retired as a police officer in 2013. He remains an executive member of the National Black Police Association and is a founder member of the Black Police Association Charitable Trust.

Personal life 
In 2003, Logan was awarded £100,000 by the Metropolitan Police following an investigation over a hotel bill. His autobiography, Closing Ranks: My Life as a Cop, was published in 2020.

In popular culture 
Logan is portrayed by John Boyega in the episode “Red, White and Blue” of Small Axe, an anthology TV series created by Steve McQueen.

Honours

Scholastic
Honorary degrees

References 

Metropolitan Police officers
1957 births
Living people
People from Islington (district)
Alumni of the University of East London